Everardo Luiz Alvares da Cruz Filho (31 May 1926 – 23 May 2003) was a Brazilian water polo player. He competed in the men's tournament at the 1960 Summer Olympics.

Cruz died in Rio de Janeiro on 23 May 2003, at the age of 76.

References

1926 births
2003 deaths
Brazilian male water polo players
Olympic water polo players of Brazil
Water polo players at the 1960 Summer Olympics